Threestoneburn Stone Circle is an archaeological site, a stone circle near the village of Ilderton and about  south of Wooler, in Northumberland, England. It is a scheduled monument.

Description
The circle, of the late Neolithic or early Bronze Age, is situated in a large clearing in the modern afforestation of Threestoneburn Wood, formerly overlooking a spacious valley to the east. It is on a slight promontory near the confluence of Threestone Burn and one of its tributaries. Four of these are upright, with heights ; the rest are recumbent.

Excavation
There was partial excavation in 1856. A thick layer of peat was found above the ground surface. A flint tool was found, and spreads of charcoal which may be the traces of fire-rituals.

See also
 Stone circles in the British Isles and Brittany

References

Scheduled monuments in Northumberland
Archaeological sites in Northumberland
Stone circles in England